Dellinger may refer to:

Places
 Dellinger (crater), a lunar crater that is located on the Moon's far side
 78392 Dellinger (2002 PM165), a main-belt asteroid discovered on 2002 by A. Lowe

Other uses
 Dellinger (surname)
 Gundam Dellinger Arms, a mobile unit from the anime series Mobile Suit Gundam Wing
 Dellinger effect, a fadeout of short-wave radios caused by solar flares

See also 
 Dillinger (disambiguation)